Lkhamsürengiin Dorjsüren (born 1 October 1948) is a Mongolian professional football manager. In 1993 and 1998 he was coach of the Mongolia national football team.

Career 
From 1976 until 1993 he coached the Nairamdal. In 1993 he became the coach of Erchim. In 1993 and 1998 he was head coach of the Mongolia national football team.

Achievements
 Mongolia Premier League: (8)
 Winner: 1996, 1998, 2000, 2002, 2007, 2008, 2012, 2013
 Runner-up: 1997, 1999, 2009
 Mongolia Cup: (7)
 Winner: 1996, 1997, 1998, 1999, 2000, 2011, 2012
 Runner-up: 2001, 2002
 Mongolia Super Cup: (3)
 Winner: 2011, 2012, 2013
National Championship 
 Winner: 1994
National Youth Championship 
 Winner: 1994

Awards           
 Best Coach of the Year: 1996, 1997.

References

Living people
1948 births
Mongolian football managers
Mongolia national football team managers